Đorđije "Đoko" Pajković (25 June 1917, Lužac, Berane, Kingdom of Montenegro – 17 January 1980, Belgrade, SR Serbia, Yugoslavia) was a Yugoslav Montenegrin politician. 

He was the leader of  the League of Communists of Montenegro from June 1963 to December 1968. He previously served as the President of the Executive Council of the SR Montenegro from 16 December 1962 to 25 June 1963. 

He also served as the President of the Assembly of SAP Kosovo from 12 December 1953 to 5 May 1956 and the leader of the League of Communists of Kosovo from March 1945 to February 1956. 

In 1953, he was chosen to be a National Hero of Yugoslavia.

References

Sources

References

1917 births
1980 deaths
People from Berane
Yugoslav Partisans members
League of Communists of Montenegro politicians
League of Communists of Kosovo politicians
Montenegrin communists
Recipients of the Order of the People's Hero
Recipients of the Order of the Hero of Socialist Labour